Dionysius of Lamptrai was an Epicurean philosopher, who succeeded Polystratus as the head (scholarch) of the Epicurean school at Athens . He died  and was succeeded by Basilides.

References

3rd-century BC Greek people
3rd-century BC philosophers
Epicurean philosophers
Hellenistic-era philosophers in Athens
Year of birth unknown
200s BC deaths